was a junior college in Takamatsu, Kagawa, Japan, and was part of the Kagawa Meizen Gakuen network.

History
The institute was founded as Meizen Koutou Jogakkou in 1917, and became Kagawaken Meizen Junior College in 1956.
In 1969 a new campus was founded, but in 2000 this was discontinued.
In 2004 Kagawaken Meizen Junior College closed because of decrease in the number of students.

Educational institutions established in 1956
Japanese junior colleges
Universities and colleges in Kagawa Prefecture
1956 establishments in Japan